Yvonne Deslandres (1923–1986) was a French writer, curator, archivist, and art historian. She specialized in costume and adornment.

She studied at École Nationale des Chartes. She worked for François Boucher as his assistant at the Carnavalet Museum, and later for his Union Française des Arts du Costume (UFAC), which she took over after his death in 1966. She became curator for the Musée de la mode et du textile from 1983 after the UFAC merged with it.

Works
 20,000 Years of Fashion: The History of Costume and Personal Adornment, together with Francois Boucher, 1963-1966, and updated in 1987
 Le Costume, image de l'homme, 1976
 l'Histoire de la Mode au XXe Siecle, 1986
 Poiret: Paul Poiret 1879-1944, 1987

References

External links 
 
 

1923 births
1986 deaths
École Nationale des Chartes alumni
20th-century French historians
French art historians
Winners of the Prix Broquette-Gonin (literature)
20th-century French women writers
Women art historians
French women historians